Whale Island is the name of several islands, including:

 Moutohora Island, also known as Whale Island, New Zealand
 Whale Island (Alaska), United States
 Whale Island, Hampshire, United Kingdom
 Whale Island, an island in the Torres Strait, Queensland, Australia